Featured here is a chronological list of story arcs in the comic book series Ultimate Comics: Spider-Man, created by Brian Michael Bendis and drawn initially by Sara Pichelli. The series is a sequel to the original Ultimate Spider-Man.

Ultimate Comics: Spider-Man

Who Is Miles Morales? (#1–5)
Published: September 2011 - December 2011
Creative Team: Brian Michael Bendis / Sara Pichelli / Justin Ponsor
Plot Outline: Eleven months prior to the Death of Spider-Man, Norman Osborn creates another spider, deemed Spider 42. The Spider 42 crawls into the bag of The Prowler as he steals from a secure safe containing the research on the spider. Miles Morales, who is now accepted through a lottery into a charter school, goes to visit his Uncle Aaron, The Prowler. The Spider 42, that hid in Aaron's bag gets out, bites Miles who convulses and passes out. Miles runs out, only to discover he can turn invisible. After running through the streets and learning of his new extraordinary spider-like powers, Miles goes to visit his friend Ganke that suggests that he may be a mutant. Jefferson Davis, Miles dad, then shows up and takes Miles to the park where he explains that he doesn't like Miles being around Aaron because he is a thief. Miles later tests his powers by saving a young girl from a burning apartment complex. Two months later, as he is moving into charter school, he dreams about Electro in his dorm and killing him as "Spider-Man". He then wakes up and heads into the gym where a teacher reports that Spider-Man has been shot on the Queensborough Bridge. Miles witnesses Peter Parker's death, then explains to Ganke that he feels guilty, as if he'd decided to become a hero when he got his powers, this might have never happened. The two attend Peter's funeral, where Miles questions Gwen Stacy why Peter became Spider-Man. Subsequently, Ganke gives Miles his Spider-Man costume that he'd worn for Halloween, and Miles merges victorious in a fight against The Kangaroo. Following this, Miles goes out as Spider-Man only to run into Spider-Woman, who takes him into S.H.I.E.L.D. custody. There, Nick Fury reveals that he knows all about Miles and his family, including his uncle's criminal activity. Meanwhile, Electro escapes from custody but is quickly defeated by Miles. S.H.I.E.L.D. releases Miles, and Jessica Drew shows up at school to give him a modified black and red version of the Spider-Man costume.
First appearances: Miles Morales/Spider-Man II, Aaron Davis, Jefferson Davis, Rio Morales, Ganke
Deaths: Electro

Scorpion (#6–12)
Published: January 2012 - July 2012
Creative Team: Brian Michael Bendis / Chris Samnee / Sara Pichelli / David Marquez / Justin Ponsor
Plot Outline: Miles encounters The Prowler, a new villain that has an unlikely connection to his family.
First appearances: Maximus Gargan
Deaths: Aaron Davis

United We Stand/Divided We Fall (#13–18)
Published: August 2012 - December 2012
Creative Team: Brian Michael Bendis / David Marquez / Pepe Larraz / Justin Ponsor
Plot Outline: Miles attempts to become a member of the Ultimates when the nation goes to war against HYDRA and will do anything it takes to earn the right.
First appearances: Maria Hill

Venom Wars (#16.1, 19–22)
Published: October 2012, January 2013 - April 2013
Creative Team: Brian Michael Bendis / Sara Pichelli / David Marquez / Justin Ponsor
Plot Outline: In UCSM 16.1, Betty Brant goes over footage of the Spider-Man/Prowler battle from the "Scorpion" arc, looking at whether Spider-Man knew Aaron Davis, the Prowler. She tracks several leads which gets her to Jefferson Davis, who she believes is the new Spidey. J. Jonah Jameson won't take the news out of respect for Peter Parker, but before she can break it, the new Venom kills her. The plot then goes to Maria Hill investigating Betty's death, and Jefferson Davis continues to be hounded by the media as a "hero", all while Miles is being eyed by a new girl. The new Venom blows up Oscorp and arrives at Miles' house, looking for Jefferson Davis, who he believes is Spider-Man. Miles confronts him, and the two have a fight that injures Jefferson. Rio follows him to the hospital, while Venom gets away. Gwen and Mary Jane show up to explain Venom's importance, and Miles instantly follows his parents to save them. Venom bursts through the hospital for "Spider-Man", but once the cops and Spider-Man show up, Rio gets in the middle and is shot accidentally. Venom is downed as well, revealed to be Doctor Marcus from #16.1, who wanted Spider-Man because he "made" him. Rio dies in Miles' arms, leading him to declare "Spider-Man No More".
First appearances: Venom, Katie Bishop
Deaths: Betty Brant, Rio Morales

Spider-Man No More (#23–28)
Published: May 2013-October 2013
Creative Team: Brian Michael Bendis / David Marquez / Justin Ponsor
Plot Outline: This story starts one year after the events of "Venom Wars". As a fourteen-year-old, Miles is dating Katie Bishop, and he's completely given up being Spider-Man, despite convincing attempts by Jessica Drew to put him back in the role. Jefferson, his dad, is a little grizzled now, and has a bum leg, where has to walk to take care of it. At a restaurant, Miles meets Gwen Stacy again as a waitress, who unsuccessfully tries to get him back to being Spider-Man. This is all interrupted by a street battle between Bombshell (with her mom's costume), and Cloak & Dagger.
First appearances: Cloak, Dagger, Taskmaster

Collected editions

See also

 List of Ultimate Spider-Man story arcs
 List of Ultimate Fantastic Four story arcs
 List of Ultimate X-Men story arcs
 Ultimate Comics: Enemy Trilogy
 Ultimate Comics: Fallout

References

Spider-Man story arcs, List of Ultimate Comics:
Ultimate Comics: Spider-Man story arcs, List of
Ultimate Comics: Spider-Man
Spider-Man lists